Gävle Castle is a palace in Gävle, Sweden, rebuilt several times since its foundation in 1583. It is the official residence of the County Governor of Gävleborg County.

The first castle
The original castle was built 1583–1593 by the Swedish crown. The architect was Willem Boy.

Restoration
After several decades of decay, the castle was rebuilt during the 1650s and the 1660s. The castle now became the residence of the governor, and office of the provincial government.

Rebuilding
A severe fire in 1727 destroyed large parts of the castle, and it was left in ruins until 1741 when Carl Hårleman was commissioned to rebuild it into a modern residence and government office. The rebuilding was completed in 1754.

Castles in Gävleborg County
Official residences of Swedish county governors